The 1912 South Carolina gubernatorial election was held on November 5, 1912, to select the governor of the state of South Carolina. Governor Coleman Livingston Blease won the Democratic primary. As South Carolina was a utterly dominated by the Democratic Party, he faced no significant opposition in the general election.

Democratic primary
Governor Coleman Livingston Blease ran for a second term, but he faced a credible challenge in the state Democratic primary against Ira B. Jones. Senator Ben Tillman felt that Blease had greatly damaged the reputation of the state and was morally unfit to be governor, but because his re-election was on the same ballot he feared to openly oppose Blease so as to cause his own political downfall. Nevertheless, Tillman published a letter at the last minute stating his opposition to Blease. It was rather ironic because Tillman was essentially aiding the very people he had opposed in his 1890 gubernatorial contest. Despite Tillman's objection, Blease won the primary election on August 27 and avoided a runoff election by obtaining more than 50 percent of the vote.

General election
The general election was held on November 5, 1912, when Coleman Livingston Blease was officially re-elected governor of South Carolina. Turnout increased over the previous gubernatorial election because there was also a presidential election on the ballot.

 
 

|-
| 
| colspan=5 |Democratic hold
|-

See also
Governor of South Carolina
List of governors of South Carolina
South Carolina gubernatorial elections

References

"Report of the Secretary of State to the General Assembly of South Carolina.  Part II." Reports and Resolutions of the General Assembly of the State of South Carolina. Volume III. Columbia, South Carolina: 1913, pp. 422–423.

External links
SCIway Biography of Coleman Livingston Blease

1912
Gubernatorial
1912 United States gubernatorial elections
November 1912 events in the United States